Lego DC Comics Super Heroes: Batman Be-Leaguered is an animated superhero short film based on the Lego and DC Comics brands. It premiered on Cartoon Network on October 27, 2014 and is the second Lego DC Comics film following Lego Batman: The Movie – DC Super Heroes Unite. The film was released on DVD with Lego DC Comics Super Heroes: Justice League vs. Bizarro League in 2015.

Plot
In Gotham City, Batman is fighting Man-Bat at the museum when he is then ambushed by Penguin. Superman arrives in Gotham City where he wants Batman to join his new superhero team called the Justice League, but Batman prides himself on being a self-sufficient loner. To Batman's annoyance, Superman aids him in fighting Man-Bat, Penguin, and Penguin's Robo-Penguins even when Joker joins the fight. After he defeats Penguin, Man-Bat, and Joker, Superman flies out, but he then disappears along with the villains and the gem.

Because of his disappearance which is even reported by Lois Lane, Batman calls in the Flash to help with his search for Superman. The Flash travels around the world with Batman following in the Batwing until they find Captain Cold trying to steal an obelisk in Egypt. Flash and Batman fight him, but Flash disappears mid fight while Batman is frozen solid without his utility belt. Batman thaws and defeats Cold, but he and the obelisk disappear. Upon finding Atlantean symbols on the obelisk before its disappearance, Batman decides to make another call.

Batman then asks Aquaman for help in the Batboat as they search under the ocean. They find Black Manta and his robot sharks trying to steal the Trident of Poseidon. Batman once again wins the fight, but Aquaman, Black Manta, and the trident all disappear.

Batman then goes to Metropolis where Wonder Woman and Cyborg are fighting Lex Luthor who is trying to steal the Daily Planet Globe for an anonymous buyer. Once again, the Justice League members disappear, Batman defeats Lex Luthor, but he and the globe disappear.

Batman deduces who is behind it, and travels to the Justice League headquarters at the Hall of Justice (the last place he wanted to go). Once there, he identifies Bat-Mite as the culprit as Bat-Mite emerges from the shadows. Bat-Mite has prepared a trap for the Justice League including all of the stolen items. Batman does nothing which Bat-Mite did not expect. But he did hint them that since the cage was immune to their powers, they shouldn't use them, and they escaped by opening the door. Batman promptly accepts the invitation to the Justice League. Bat-Mite summons the villains, but they are easily defeated by the combined might of the Justice League, so Bat-Mite decides that instead of cheering on one hero, he should cheer on an entire team. Before disappearing, Bat-Mite makes the villains disappear.

The rest of the Justice League is pleased that Batman is on their team as Batman laughs with them.

Cast
 Troy Baker as Bruce Wayne / Batman
 Dee Bradley Baker as Arthur Curry / Aquaman, Man-Bat
 Grey DeLisle as Lois Lane, Diana Prince / Wonder Woman
 John DiMaggio as Joker, Lex Luthor
 Tom Kenny as Penguin
 Nolan North as Kal-El/Clark Kent / Superman, Alfred Pennyworth
 Khary Payton as Victor Stone / Cyborg
 Paul Reubens as Bat-Mite
 Kevin Michael Richardson as Black Manta, Captain Cold
 James Arnold Taylor as Barry Allen / Flash

References

External links
 Lego DC Comics: Batman Be-Leaguered at Internet Movie Database

2014 animated films
2014 television films
2014 films
2014 short films
2010s animated superhero television films
2010s Warner Bros. animated short films
Animated Justice League films
Direct-to-video animated films based on DC Comics
Films about toys
DC Comics
Films about sentient toys
Films directed by Rick Morales